A liana bridge is a suspended bridge made of liana vines. These bridges are most widespread in the tropical climates of Latin America, Africa and South-East Asia.

Simple suspension bridges
Bridges by structural type